Jacint Verdaguer i Santaló (17 May 1845 – 10 June 1902) was a  Catalan / Spanish writer, regarded as one of the greatest poets of Catalan literature and a prominent literary figure of the Renaixença, a cultural revival movement of the late Romantic era.  The bishop Josep Torras i Bages, one of the main figures of Catalan nationalism, called him the "Prince of Catalan poets". He was also known as mossèn (Father) Cinto Verdaguer, because of his career as a priest, and informally also simply "mossèn Cinto" (with Cinto being a short form of Jacint).

Life 
He was born in Folgueroles, a town on the Plain of Vic, in the comarca of Osona (Province of Barcelona) to a modest family who valued learning. His father, Josep Verdaguer i Ordeix (Tavèrnoles, 1817 – Folgueroles, 1876), was a brickmason and farmer. His mother, Josepa Santaló i Planes (Folgueroles, 1819–1871), a housewife and farmer, was to exercise great influence over young Jacint, as she conveyed to him a love of literature, especially poetry, and was a deeply religious woman. He was the third of eight children, only three of whom survived. In 1855, at the age of 10, he entered the Seminary of Vic, as was expected for a child who was not the first-born under the system of primogeniture and had to make his livelihood without relying on an inheritance. Until then, he had lived like the other children in his town. The anecdotes told about him show that he stood out from his peers for his intelligence, astuteness and courage, as well as his athletic constitution. He displayed a balanced attitude without any apparent religious inclinations.

In 1863, when he was 18, he started to work as a tutor for a family at the Can Tona masia (where he also helped out on the farm), while he continued to study. Can Tona is in the municipal district of Sant Martí de Riudeperes, today Calldetenes (Osona). In 1865, he participated in Barcelona's Jocs Florals—or "Floral Games"—poetry contest and won four prizes. The next year he won two prizes in the same Jocs Florals.

On 24 September 1870 he was ordained a priest by the bishop Lluís Jordà in Vic, and in October that same year, he said his first Mass, in the Sant Jordi hermitage. The next day he said his second Mass in the Sant Francesc hermitage near Vic. In 1871, his mother died (January 17) at the age of 52. On September 1 he was appointed bishop coadjutor of the small town of Vinyoles d'Orís and three days later he took up his charge.

In 1873, he published the cant (ode or song) "Passió de Nostre Senyor Jesucrist" (Passion of Our Lord Jesus Christ). He left Vinyoles d'Orís for health reasons and moved to Vic. He went on a trip to Roussillon and saw the mountain, El Canigó, possibly for the first time. In December, he joined the Companyia Transatlàntica trans-Atlantic steamship company as a chaplain because he was prescribed sea air for his health; he embarked in Cádiz bound for Havana.

On 8 September 1876 his father died at the age of 65. On board the "Ciudad Condal", on the return voyage from Cuba, Jacint Verdaguer finished his epic poem L'Atlàntida. In November he entered the palace of the Marquis of Comillas as an alms chaplain.

In 1877, when he was 32, and having returned from his journey, the jury of the Jocs Florals awarded him the special prize of the Diputation of Barcelona for L'Atlàntida. Now he had earned his reputation as a poet.
In 1878, he traveled to Rome, where he was granted an audience with Pope Leo XIII. They discussed Verdaguer's poem L'Atlàntida. In 1880, as the winner of three prizes in the Jocs Florals, he was proclaimed "Master of the Gay Sciences" (Mestre en Gai Saber). That same year he published his book of poetry, Montserrat, which included "Llegenda de Montserrat", a legend (or two) in the form of a poem with 13 cantos.

In 1883, the Barcelona City Council published a print-run of a hundred thousand copies of his "Oda a Barcelona" (Ode to Barcelona), a 46-stanza poem. Such a print-run was quite a remarkable given that the population of Barcelona at the time was 350,000, which would have amounted to about a copy per household. At the age of 39, Verdaguer traveled to Paris, Switzerland, Germany and Russia.
His collection of poems Caritat (Charity, 1885) was published to raise funds for reconstruction after the Andalusian earthquake of 25 December 1884.
On 21 March 1886, when he was 41 years old, Bishop Morgades crowned him 'Poet of Catalonia' in the monastery of Ripoll. He published the epic poem Canigó and made a pilgrimage to the Holy Land.

In 1893, following controversy about aspects of his work as a priest, he left the post of alms chaplain at the Marqués de Comillas' palace. The publication of the trilogy Jesús Infant was completed, and he was assigned to the sanctuary of La Gleva.  For a period, he was stripped of his office as priest, although this was eventually restored.  In 1894, the books Roser de tot l'any and Veus del bon pastor were published. On 31 March he left the sanctuary of La Gleva.

On 17 May 1902, his 57th birthday, he moved from his home at Carrer Aragó 235 in Barcelona to the country house known as Vil·la Joana, in Vallvidrera (Barcelona), where he hoped to convalesce. On 10 June he died in Vil·la Joana, which is now one of the Barcelona City History Museum (MUHBA) heritage sites.

Verdaguer was buried in Montjuïc Cemetery in Barcelona.

He was depicted on the Spanish 1971 500 Pesetas banknote.

Selected works 
Among his works are: 
 L'Atlàntida (Atlantis, 1876), epic poem
 Idil·lis i cants místics (Idylls and Mystic Songs, 1879), book of poems
 Montserrat (1880, 1899), book of poems on the topic of Montserrat
 "A Barcelona" ("To Barcelona", 1883), ode in 46 stanzas
 Caritat (Charity, 1885)
 Canigó (1886), epic poem
 Sant Francesc (Saint Francis, 1895)
 Flors del Calvari (Flowers of Calvary, 1896)

The scenic cantata Atlàntida, composed by Manuel de Falla and completed after de Falla's death by Ernesto Halffter, is based on Verdaguer's L'Atlàntida.  Manuel de Falla considered this large-scale orchestral piece to be the most important of all his works.

Some of his shorter poems are well known as songs in Catalonia, especially "L'Emigrant" ("Sweet Catalonia, country of my heart...").

Bibliography
Verdaguer's works are collected in English in: 
 Selected Poems of Jacint Verdaguer: A Bilingual Edition, edited and translated by Ronald Puppo, with an introduction by Ramon Pinyol i Torrents, University of Chicago Press, 2007, 339 pp.,

See also
 Pi de les Tres Branques, a tree popularised by Verdaguer as a Catalan national symbol
 Verdaguer House-Museum in Folgueroles
 Barcelona City History Museum and its Vil·la Joana House

References

General references
This article draws heavily on the corresponding article in the Catalan-language Wikipedia, which was accessed in the versions of December 21, 2005 and February 2016.

External links 

 
 Jacint Verdaguer  at the Association of Writers in the Catalan Language website, with a biography , and a complete bibliography, a brief anthology (excerpts), a collection of articles of literary criticism on his work, etc. in Catalan.
 About Jacint Verdaguer and his place in Catalan literature, in Visat, a digital journal on literature and translation by the Catalan Chapter of PEN International. Visat No. 10, October 2010. 
 Jacint Verdaguer i Santaló, Gran Enciclopèdia Catalana  
 VERDAGUER'S HOUSE MUSEUM in Folgueroles, near Vic 
 Vil·la Joana , a masia on Collserola forming part of the Barcelona City History Museum (MUHBA) 

 
1845 births
1902 deaths
Burials at Montjuïc Cemetery
Writers from Catalonia
Catalan-language writers
Catalan-language poets